is a series of  written by British author Martin Millar under the pen name  Martin Scott.

Overview
The stories take place in a mythical, Middle-earth-type World that includes Humans, Orcs, Elves, and a variety of magical creatures. Thraxas, the eponymous protagonist, is a middle-aged private investigator in the city-state of Turai, a kingdom of middling influence and power. In the pre-series timeline he had been a failed sorcery student, an able soldier, and a far-travelled mercenary. He also used to work at the Palace of Turai, but was booted out for his drunken behavior.

As the series begins, Thraxas is still an excellent swordsman and competent fighter, and has retained some minor magical ability. Mainly though, he just gambles, drinks a lot of beer, and consumes a lot of food. He is always broke and has to live in the poor, rough part of the city, above the tavern of his old friend Gurd, a barbarian. Thraxas is overweight, somewhat bad-tempered, and a keen gambler at the chariot races. In between his other pursuits, he tries to support himself as a detective-for-hire.

Thraxas is usually helped in his cases by his young friend Makri, an escapee from the Orcish gladiator pits, and the best fighter ever seen in Turai. Makri is part Human, part Orc, and part Elf, and she often suffers prejudice from all three races. She works as a waitress at Gurd's tavern, wearing a skimpy chainmail bikini to entice the rough-and-tumble working class customers into leaving better tips. Her exotic good looks and lithe physique have earned her quite a few admirers, but she also has intellectual aspirations, studying at a Turanian College.

Later in the series the bulk of the action shifts away from Turai, as the city is conquered by an Orcish army and most characters, including Thraxas and Makri, are forced to flee. Following the fall of Turai, Thraxas tentatively regains part of his previous status when he is given official responsibilities in the effort to retake the city. This development however has little effect on his behavior or reputation, and as the Orcs (thanks partly to his involvement) are finally defeated, he is again implicated in controversy.

The stories narrated in first person by Thraxas happen in real time and are in chronological order. They are also linked by the presence of many of the same characters throughout the series. Typically, Thraxas finds himself entangled in dangerous but realistic situations that involve political intrigue and all kinds of conspiracies. Through luck and pluck, as well as a well-honed sense of humor, he somehow manages to pull through against heavy odds.

Titles

Publication history
The first eight titles were originally released in the UK by Orbit Books as mass market paperbacks between 1999 and 2005; several titles were also released in hardcover by the series' North American publisher Baen Books, starting with Thraxas and the Sorcerers  in 2005. English-language e-book editions were released by Orbit Books-affiliated publisher Hachette Digital in  Series books have also been published in several other countries and 

After the eighth novel, Orbit did not want to publish additional installments. In addition, Millar's agent could not come to an agreement regarding rights of future Thraxas titles with Baen Books. Baen was also republishing the series in omnibus form, two titles at a time ; it stopped publication after the second omnibus 

Despite the difficulties with publishers, Millar stated that he planned to continue with the series. In  he blogged that he had nearly finished a 9thbook, Thraxas and the Ice Dragon. It was eventually released in  almost eight years after the previous volume as an e-book through BookBaby, a self-publishing company.

They were released through CreateSpace, a print on demand self-publishing subsidiary of Amazon.  all republished titles were listed in Amazon websites as part of The Collected Thraxas 

Select editions

Reception
Locus reviewer Jonathan Strahan praised the first novel in the series as "an entertaining addition to the fantasy PI bookshelf," further stating, "Scott is careful to balance the various requirements of humorous fantasy and PI crime 

A favorable review of the second omnibus Death and Thraxas maintained, "he strength of  novels lies in their humor and quirky characters. In an also-favorable2005 review of  Thraxas and the Sorcerers in the science fiction magazine Chronicle, frequent series reviewer Don D'Ammassa stated, "he first few volumes in the series were pretty frothy, but I've actually become more fond of the character with the recent 

A mini-review by Jon Courtenay Grimwood of Thraxas at War  appeared in The Guardian (London) in 

The first book in the series, Thraxas, was the winner of  World Fantasy Award.

Notes

References

External links
  published by the author

Fantasy novel series
World Fantasy Award for Best Novel-winning works